Simone Falloni (born 26 July 1991 in San Cesareo) is an Italian athlete specialising in the hammer throw.

Career
He represented his country at the 2017 World Championships without qualifying for the final. His biggest success to date is the bronze medal at the 2017 European Throwing Cup.

His personal best in the event is 76.33 m set in Rieti in 2021.

Achievements

References

External links
 

1991 births
Living people
Italian male hammer throwers
World Athletics Championships athletes for Italy
Sportspeople from the Metropolitan City of Rome Capital
Competitors at the 2015 Summer Universiade
Athletics competitors of Centro Sportivo Aeronautica Militare